Hardikar Hospital is a Multi Speciality  hospital in Pune, Maharashtra, India. It has 120 beds, serves as a private institution, and has a medical school attached to it.

Hardikar Hospital also refers to a 5-bed hospital in Dombivli, India.

External links 
 

Hospitals in Pune
Year of establishment missing